The 1996–97 Liga Nacional de Fútbol Femenino was the 10th season of the Spanish women's football first division. San Vicente won its first title.

Group 1

Group 2

Group 3

Group 4

Final four
The Final Four was played between the four group winners. Finally, the title was won by San Vicente.

References

1996-97
Spa
1
women